Minuscule 33 (in the Gregory-Aland numbering), δ 48 (Soden), before the French Revolution was called Codex Colbertinus 2844. It is a Greek minuscule manuscript of the New Testament on parchment, dated palaeographically to the 9th century. The manuscript is lacunose. It has marginalia. According to the textual critics it is one of the best minuscule manuscripts of the New Testament.

Description 

The codex contains part of the Prophets of the Old Testament, and all the books of the New Testament (except Revelation of John), on 143 parchment leaves, with three lacunae in Gospel of Mark, and Gospel of Luke (Mark 9:31-11:11; 13:11-14:60; Luke 21:38-23:26).

It contains Prolegomena to the Catholic epistles and the Pauline epistles (folios 73-76), the Euthalian Apparatus.

It is written on a parchment in minuscule, in 1 column per page, 48-52 lines per page. Part of almost of every leaf has been destroyed by dampness. The leaves were joined so firmly to each other — especially in the Book of Acts — that when separated, a part of the ink has adhered to the opposite page. Text is with errors of iotacism. 
The ends of the leaves are much damaged.

The order of books: Gospels, Acts, Catholic epistles, Pauline epistles (Hebrews placed before 1 Timothy).
Ending of the Epistle to the Romans has the following order of verses: 16:23; 16:25-27; 16:24 (as in codices P 104 256 263 365 436 459 1319 1573 1852 arm).

Text 

Verse Matthew 21:44 is omitted, as in manuscripts: 𝔓104, Codex Bezae, some Old-Latin manuscripts (b, d, e, ff1, ff2, r1), syrs, and Diatessaron. This verse belongs to the possible Western non-interpolations. It does not contain text of Matthew 16:2b–3.

Matthew 8:13
 It has additional text: και υποστρεψας ο εκατονταρχος εις τον οικον αυτου εν αυτη τη ωρα ευρεν τον παιδα υγιαινοντα (and when the centurion returned to the house in that hour, he found the slave well) as well as codices א, C, (N), Θ, (0250), f1, (1241), g1, syrh.

In Matthew 16:12 it has unique textual variant της ζυμης των Φαρισαιων (the leaven of the Pharisees). This variant is not supported by any other manuscript.

In Matthew 27:9 in sentence επληρωθη το ρηθεν δια Ιερεμιου του προφητου (fulfilled what was spoken by Jeremiah the prophet) the word Ιερεμιου (Jeremiah) is omitted, just like in manuscripts: Codex Beratinus, Old-Latin Codex Vercellensis (a), and Codex Veronensis (b), in syrs, syrp, and copbo.

In Luke 4:17 it has textual variant καὶ ἀνοίξας τὸ βιβλίον (and opened the book) together with the manuscripts A, B, L, W, Ξ, 892, 1195, 1241, ℓ 547, syrs, h, pal, copsa, bo, against variant καὶ ἀναπτύξας τὸ βιβλίον (and unrolled the book) supported by א, Dc, K, Δ, Θ, Π, Ψ, f1, f13, 28, 565, 700, 1009, 1010 and many other manuscripts.

In Acts 20:28 it reads του κυριου (of the Lord) together with the manuscripts Papyrus 74 C* D E Ψ 36 453 945 1739 1891. The other readings of this verse are: του Θεου (of the God) and του κυριου και του Θεου (of the Lord and God).

In Acts 28:29 the entire of verse is omitted και ταυτα αυτου ειποντος απηλθον οι Ιουδαιοι πολλην εχοντης εν εαυτοις συζητησιν (And when he had said these words, the Jews departed and had a great dispute among themselves); the omission is supported by the manuscripts Papyrus 74, Codex Sinaiticus, Alexandrinus, Vaticanus, Codex Laudianus, Codex Athous Lavrensis, Codex Vaticanus 2061, 81, 1175, 1739, 2464;

In Romans 8:1 it reads Ιησου κατα σαρκα περιπατουσιν αλλα κατα πνευμα, for Ιησου. The reading of the manuscript is supported by אc, Dc, K, P, 104, 181, 326, 330, (436 omit μη), 456, 614, 630, 1241, 1877, 1962, 1984, 1985, 2492, 2495, Byz, Lect.

In 1 Corinthians 2:1 it reads μαρτυριον along with B D G P Ψ 81 104 181 326 330 451 614 629 630 1241 1739 1877 1881 1962 1984 2127 2492 2495 Byz Lect it vg syrh copsa arm eth. Other manuscripts read μυστηριον or σωτηριον.

In 1 Corinthians 3:4 it reads ουκ ανθρωποι along with Papyrus 46, Sinaiticus, Alexandrinus, Vaticanus, Ephraemi, Codex Vaticanus 2061, 81, 1175, 1506, 1739, 1881; Sinaiticus2, Ψ, and the Byzantine manuscripts read ουχι σαρκικοι; D F G 629 read ουχι ανθρωποι;

In 1 Corinthians 7:5 it reads τη προσευχη (prayer) along with 𝔓11, 𝔓46, א*, A, B, C, D, F, G, P, Ψ, 6, 81, 104, 181, 629, 630, 1739, 1877, 1881, 1962, it vg, cop, arm, eth. Other manuscripts read τη νηστεια και τη προσευχη (fasting and prayer) or τη προσευχη και νηστεια (prayer and fasting).

In 2 Timothy 1:11 it reads καὶ διάκονος (and servant), other manuscripts read καὶ διδάσκαλος (and teacher) or καὶ διδάσκαλος ἐθνῶν (and teacher of nations).

Its Greek text of the Gospels is an excellent representative of the Alexandrian text-type, but with some Byzantine readings, particularly in Acts of the Apostles and the Pauline epistles. Aland placed it in Category II in Gospels and to Category I in rest of books of the New Testament. According to the Claremont Profile Method it represents the Alexandrian text-type as its weak member.

History 

Scholz and Martin dated the manuscript to the 11th century. Gregory dated it to the 9th or 10th century. Currently it is dated by the INTF to the 9th century.

It was called "the queen of the cursives" by J. G. Eichhorn (1752-1827), but now it has several rivals (81, 892, 1175, 1739). The manuscript was examined by many scholars, such as Griesbach, who collated its text in Matthew 1-18. It was also studied by Birch and others. The text of the codex was fully collated by S. P. Tregelles in 1850. Tregelles said that, of all the manuscripts he collated (presumably excluding palimpsests), it was the hardest to read.

It was examined and described by Paulin Martin. C. R. Gregory saw the manuscript twice, in 1884 and in 1885.

The manuscript was included to a critical apparatus by Kurt Aland in his 25th edition of Novum Testamentum Graece (1963).

The codex is located now at the National Library of France (Cod. Gr. 14) at Paris.

See also 

 List of New Testament minuscules
 Biblical manuscript
 Textual criticism

Notes

References

Further reading 

 
 T. C. Geer, The two Faces of Codex 33 in Acts, Novum Testamentum XXXI, 1 (1989).

External links 

 
 R. Waltz, Minuscule 33, Encyclopedia of Textual Criticism (2007)

Greek New Testament minuscules
9th-century biblical manuscripts
Bibliothèque nationale de France collections